Jean-Marie Arnould (born 27 May 1966) is a retired Belgian butterfly and freestyle swimmer. He competed in four events at the 1988 Summer Olympics.

References

External links
 

1966 births
Living people
Belgian male butterfly swimmers
Belgian male freestyle swimmers
Olympic swimmers of Belgium
Swimmers at the 1988 Summer Olympics
Sportspeople from Luxembourg (Belgium)
People from Arlon